Argyromima is a genus of bristle flies in the family Tachinidae.

Species
Argyromima mirabilis Brauer & von Bergenstamm, 1889

Distribution
Ecuador.

References

Diptera of South America
Dexiinae
Tachinidae genera
Taxa named by Friedrich Moritz Brauer
Taxa named by Julius von Bergenstamm